Parker v McKenna (1874–75) LR 10 Ch App 96 is a UK company law case, concerning the rule against having any conflict of interest.

Facts
Mr McKenna was one of four directors of the National Bank of Ireland, a joint stock bank. In 1864 resolutions were passed to increase the capital by issuing 20,000 £50 shares. They were to be offered to old shareholders first according to how many they already held, for a £25 premium and £5 as a first call. Any not bought would be sold by directors at a £30 premium. The directors allotted 9778 shares to a Mr Stock, who paid only £5 a share. It was arranged that the certificates would be withheld, the bank had a lien on the shares for the premiums and no transfer could be made till £30 was paid up. He then said he could not take so many and asked the directors to relieve him. They took many at £30 a share, and then sold them on at a profit. The £30 per share was always paid to the bank.

Judgment
Lord Cairns LC, Sir WM James LJ and Sir G Mellish LJ held that the directors had to account for all profits made through the sale of the shares.

James LJ made this famous statement:

See also
Companies Act 2006, s 175
Bray v Ford

Notes

United Kingdom company case law
Court of Appeal (England and Wales) cases
1874 in case law
1874 in British law